Asarçay is a quarter of the town Oğuzlar, Oğuzlar District, Çorum Province, Turkey. Its population is 98 (2022).

References

Oğuzlar District